Khaled Jahrami (born 21 December 1962) is a Kuwaiti fencer. He competed in the individual and team épée events at the 1988 Summer Olympics.

References

External links
 

1962 births
Living people
Kuwaiti male épée fencers
Olympic fencers of Kuwait
Fencers at the 1988 Summer Olympics